"Impossible" is a 2003 single by Edyta Górniak (known as “Edyta”) from the album Invisible.

Background

The single was released in Poland, Germany, Austria and Switzerland.

"Impossible" is the first single from the album Invisible and the last after the scheduled release of the second single “The Story So Far” have been cancelled.

Chart performance

On February 2, 2003, "Impossible" debuted at number fifty-eight on the German Singles Chart, becoming Edyta's highest debut on the German Single Chart to date and her second entry in the German Chart after "One & One".

The song also debuted at number sixty-six in Austria on February 16, 2003, rising to number fifty, and at number sixty-four in Switzerland on March 2, 2003.

"Impossible" reached number thirty-five on Lista Przebojów Trójki of the public radio station Polskie Radio 3, the most popular unofficial Polish Singles Chart.

Live performances

Edyta performed "Impossible" in 2003 at the German edition of Top of the Pops on RTL, at the SWR3 Rheinland-Pfalz Open-Air in Mainz and at the Polish national selection for the Eurovision Song Contest as a show act.

Track listing

Single

 Impossible (Single Version)
 Impossible (Paradise City Club Mix)

Maxi single

 Impossible (Single Version) (4:15)
 Impossible (Paradise City Club Mix) (6:54)
 Impossible (Roy Malone King Mix - Edit) (3:34)
 Sleep with me (Album Version) (3:07)

Vinyl

A-Side

 Impossible (Paradise City Club Mix)
 Impossible (Milk & Sugar Dub Mix)

B-Side

 Impossible (Roy Malone King Mix)
 Impossible (Kelly Pitiuso Dub Mix)

Music video

At the beginning of the music video Edyta walks in white clothes through a dark hallway which is only illuminated by blinking lights and then she starts to dance, then she is sitting in black clothes on a white chair in front of a white background.

In the next scenes she dances in front of a white background alone or together with some guys, then also in front of the dark room with the blinking lights. Between this scenes Edyta is spinning also in the white chair.

In another scene Edyta is lying in the midst of colour changing LED-based lights. The video ends with a close-up view of Edyta singing into a microphone.

Versions
 Impossible (Album Version)
 Impossible (Single Version) (4:15)
 Impossible (Kelly Pitiuso Dub Mix) (6:11)
 Impossible (Milk & Sugar Remix)
 Impossible (Milk & Sugar Dub Mix) (7:27)
 Impossible (Paradise City Club Mix) (6:54)
 Impossible (Paradise City Radio Mix)
 Impossible (Roy Malone King Mix) (6:02)
 Impossible (Roy Malone King Mix - Edit) (3:34)
 Impossible (Roy Malone Remix / Single Version)
 Impossible (Roy Malone Club Mix - Edit)
 Impossible (Roy Malone Dub Mix - Edit)

Credits and personnel

 Text and music: Watkins, Wilson, Ackerman
 Producer: Absolute
 Mixed by: Jeremy Wheatley

 Photo: T. Drzewiński
 Recording company: Virgin Music (EMI Music Germany GmbH & Co. KG)
 Published by: 19 Entertainment, BMG Music, Chrysalis Music

Charts

References

External links 
 
 

2003 singles
Songs written by Tracy Ackerman
Song recordings produced by Absolute (production team)
Songs written by Andy Watkins
Songs written by Paul Wilson (songwriter)
2002 songs
Virgin Records singles